Eirik Johan Kristoffersen (born 3 April 1969) is a Norwegian Army General who serves as the head of the Norwegian Armed Forces. He is a former Chief of the Norwegian Army and Norwegian Home Guard, and Chief of the Armed Forces' Special Command (FSK).

Kristoffersen is the first Norwegian Chief of Defence since World War II, with battle experience. He was awarded the War Cross with Sword in 2011 for his service in Afghanistan.

Military career 
Kristoffersen enrolled in non-commissioned officers' in 1988 and served as squad leader in the Engineer Battalion. After a few months studying engineering in college, he returned to military service in 1989 and served as squad leader in a pioneer platoon in UNIFIL (1991-1992). 

From 1995-2000 he held several positions in the Reconnaissance Battalion, and underwent a selection process for FSK in 2000. In 2001 he was sent to Afghanistan as part of Operation Anaconda and also served in Lebanon.

He spent 12 years in FSK between 2000 and 2014, rising in the ranks from patrol member to commander. In 2014, he was appointed deputy Commander Norwegian Special Operations Command, before heading to Norwegian Joint Headquarters.

Later in 2017, he was appointed Commander Norwegian Home Guard, Commander Norwegian Army in 2019 and finally Chief of Defence in August 2020.

Embellishment of his war record (of 2007) 

On 30 October 2022, Norwegian media said that Kristoffersen's narrative regarding the one operation (of two) for which he received the War Cross with Sword - is wrong; a September 2007 operation (in Tagab Valley) of which Kristoffersen was its operations officer, did not capture a Taliban leader; the intended goal of the operation was Qari Nejat (a Taliban leader) but instead the wrong man was arrested. The Norwegian Foreign Service including its embassy in Kabul, knew that the wrong man was arrested, and so did Norwegian Intelligence Service; Kristoffersen says that he was never informed that the wrong man was arrested. 

The leader of the committee that gave War Cross with Sword - to Kristoffersen, said that we would never have given the medal if we had known that the wrong man was arrested. Previously, in a September 2022 interview, Kristoffersen said that after having read a Dagbladet article in 2009 - by Anders Sømme Hammer - that told about the 17 September 2007 arrest - in Tagab Valley, of Mohammed Naseem - Kristoffersen's conclusion was that "we still had arrested a person that two independent sources and intelligence, indicated was a Taliban leader in the valley". 

An editorial in Klassekampen in October 2022, says that Kristoffersen's story is turned on its head, because it was a bricklayer who was mistakenly arrested - not a Taliban leader; furthermore, the wrong story contributed to Kristoffersen being conferred the War Cross with Sword, and that contributed to his [quick or] "lightning-career" to the top; furthermore, his story was highlighted by the government-instigated Godal-commission which in 2016 evaluated Norway's military effort in Afghanistan - therefore the information in this affair is more than just a [blemish or] scratch on Kristoffersen's resumé - it's also a problem for the official story about Norway's effort in Afghanistan.

Other reactions include the leader of Norwegian Officers' and Specialists' Union saying that there should be openness about the justification, when someone is given a war medal.

Reactions from members of Standing Committee on Foreign Affairs and Defence: In November, Ingrid Fiskaa said that it is quite odd and disturbing that central information about arresting the wrong person, does not reach the forces who performed the operation - and the Norwegian Armed Forces in general. Bjørnar Moxnes said that for 15 years, Norwegian authorities have celebrated this operation as a great victory, while our closest allies all along have known that this was a whopping failure in which considerable military resources were used to imprison an impoverished Afghan; furthermore, Norway's official Afghanistan-investigation made a success-story out of the operation in which Norwegian special forces with American support, exploded their way into a house with women and children and abducted an Afghani bricklayer in the belief that he was a Taliban leader. MPs have demanded that the armed forces and the defense ministry, get to the bottom of what went wrong - and why the mistake did not get known.

An editorial in Klassekampen in November 2022, said that American soldiers knew within hours of the operation, that the wrong person had been arrested; furthermore, information about that was swiftly shared with Norwegian forces and Norway's embassy; furthermore, there were more details about the operation: plastic handcuffs were used on all the people living in the house from which the bricklayer was removed. Furthermore, VG (newspaper) leaned heavily on to classified information from Afghan War Diary, published by WikiLeaks, to unravel the events and the timelines of the military operation.

Later in November, an article by Kristoffersen was printed by various media; furthermore, Kristoffersen said that he has never read the justification for his War Cross with Sword; furthermore, Kristoffersen gave his view of the military operation: "The American special forces that were with us, were a small detachment that were given permission at the last moment to be with us on this operation, to gain firsthand experience with a large and complex operation" by special forces; furthermore, the American forces "were not with us, for my personal safety"; furthermore, he said that our soldiers were there for almost 20 years and now the Taliban rule, therefore it is likely that everyone that our special forces contributed to having imprisoned, has been released. Furthermore he said about the prisoner: "I don't know why he later moved or why he finally was killed".

Mohammed Naseem was killed in 2010; in 2011 Norwegian media reported his death and that "therefore the lawsuit" would not materialize; later in 2011 Kristoffersen got War Cross with Sword.

Regarding the operation in 2007 - media have been told that the [ After-action review report or] "Post operations report" had the classification [secret or] hemmelig. However, some time after Kristoffersen's article (of 2022), Forsvarets Spesialkommando told media that the post operations report instead had the classification NATO SECRET; furthermore, the report has to stay classified because of the slide film presentation in the report; furthermore, for NATO to declassify the report - all 30 NATO member countries have to approve; furthermore, what is written in the report, the Norwegian Armed Forces does not want to reveal (as of January 2023).

In February 2023, media said that the armed forces is not revealing which colleague of Kristoffersen, wrote the recommendation (in January 2010) that Kristoffersen should get "a medal of valor"; furthermore, the identity of the two superior officers that gave support to the recommendation, is being witheld; one of the latter added a disclaimer (or reservation) to the support: "however", the council that decides should consider if the war cross with sword is (really) the right award.

Military education 
1988–1989 Non-commissioned officers' training school, 1992–1995 Military Academy, Army, 2008–2009 USMC Command and Staff College, 2014–2015 United States Army War College.

Authorship 
Kristoffersen wrote the book Jegerånden- Å lede i fred, krise og krig [ The Jäger spirit – to lead in peace, crisis and war] (2020).

Awards and decorations 
Kristoffersen is one of Norway's most highly decorated soldiers still on active duty. He has received the following awards:

Norwegian medals and awards

Foreign decorations

Other awards

Personal life 
Kristoffersen lives with his wife Linn-Therece Johansen Kristoffersen and has four children from two former marriages. His interests include hunting and football.

Notes

References 

Living people
1969 births
Chiefs of Defence (Norway)
Norwegian Army generals
People from Narvik
Recipients of the War Cross with Sword (Norway)
United States Army War College alumni